John Gregory Horgan, Jr. (1866 – June 24, 1921, in San Francisco, California), nicknamed "the Banker", was an American professional player of pocket billiards and three-cushion billiards.

Biography
Horgan was born in Elmira, New York, the son of John G. Horgan, Sr. He became the 1906 world champion in pocket billiards (straight pool) by beating Tommy Hueston He became the world three-cushion billiards champion and holder of the Lambert Emblem trophy in 1912 by beating Joe Carney, a title he lost to Alfredo de Oro in 1914.

Horgan, who moved to the West Coast around 1891, died in San Francisco following a sudden illness and operation. Horace Lerch, one of his close friends, eulogized him in the Buffalo Courier-Express –

He was survived by three sisters, Mrs. Daniel Richardson, Letitia Horgan, Mrs. W. H. McGraw, and brothers Edward D. Horgan and George W. Horgan.

References

External links

American carom billiards players
American pool players
Three-cushion billiards players
World champions in pool
World champions in three-cushion billiards
1866 births
1921 deaths
Date of birth missing